Aitchison is a Scottish surname of Scots origin. It derives from the pet name Atkin, which is a diminutive of Adam.

Another variant of the name is Acheson. It corresponds to the English name Atkinson, which is particularly common in Northern England. At the time of the British Census of 1881, the relative frequency of the name Aitcheson was highest in Berwickshire (174.6 times the British average), followed by Haddingtonshire, Roxburghshire, Selkirkshire, Peeblesshire, Dumfriesshire, Edinburghshire, Linlithgowshire, Northumberland and Lanarkshire. The Aitchisons are traditionally a mainly Borders and Lowlands family. They are considered to be a sept of Clan Gordon.

In Ireland, the name is common only in Ulster and particularly in counties Antrim and Down. Some Aitchisons are descended from Planters, although the name was recorded in Ireland before that period.

Acheson is a variation of the name in Scotland and the Border region, having been originally spelled Atzinson (with the 'z' being pronounced as 'y', as in yet).

People 
 Alexander Aitchison (1850–1905), Canadian fire chief
 Barrie Aitchison (1937–2021), English footballer
 Beatrice Aitchison (1908–1997), American mathematician, statistician, and transportation economist
 Ben Aitchison (born 1999), English cricketer
 Cara Aitchison (born 1965), British human geographer and academic
 Charles Umpherston Aitchison (1832–1896), Scottish politician
 Craigie Mason Aitchison, Lord Aitchison (1882–1941), Scottish politician and judge
 His son Craigie Aitchison (painter) (1926–2009), Scottish painter
 D. Craig Aitchison (born 1968), Canadian Army officer
 Danielle Aitchison (born 2001), New Zealand para-athlete
 Dominic Aitchison (born 1976), Scottish bassist and songwriter
 Ern Aitchison (1905–1991), Australian rugby player
 George Aitchison (1825–1910), British architect
 George Aitchison (1864–1895), Scottish rugby player
 Gordon Aitchison (1909–1990), Canadian basketball player
 Guy Aitchison (born 1968), American tattoo artist and painter
 Hannah Aitchison (born 1966), American tattoo artist
 Helen Aitchison (1881–1947), English tennis player
 Holly Aitchison (born 1997), English rugby player
 Ian Aitchison (born 1936), English physicist
 Jack Aitchison (1911–1976), Australian rugby player
 Jack Aitchison (born 2000), Scottish footballer
 James Aitchison (cricketer) (1920–1994), Scottish first class cricketer
 James Edward Tierney Aitchison (1836–1898), Scottish surgeon and botanist
 James H. Aitchison (1908–1994), Canadian academic and politician
 James Aitchesoun, Master of the Scottish Mint in 1553
 Jean Aitchison (born 1938), British linguist
 Jenny Aitchison, Australian politician
 John Aitchison (1779–1875), British Army officer
 John Aitchison (1926–2016), Scottish statistician
 John Aitchison (1928–2009), English cricketer
 Martin Aitchison (1919–2016), British illustrator for Eagle comic and Ladybird books
 Peter Aitchison (born 1931), English footballer
 Peter Aitchison, New Zealand rower
 Raleigh Aitchison (1887–1958), American baseball player
 Ronald Ernest Aitchison (1921–1996), Australian physicist
Scott Aitchison (born 1973), Canadian politician
Suzy Aitchison, English actress
Tom Aitchison (1907–1977), Scotland rugby player
 W. J. Aitchison (born 1941), Canadian Army officer
 Charli XCX, real name Charlotte Aitchison (born 1992), British singer-songwriter

Other uses 
 Aitchison College, Pakistan
 Dollond & Aitchison, a British chain of opticians

See also 
 Acheson (surname)
 Atchison (disambiguation)
 Atkinson (surname)

References 

English-language surnames
Surnames of English origin
Surnames of Lowland Scottish origin
Surnames of Ulster-Scottish origin